Lough Graney is a lake in County Clare, Ireland. The lake's outlet is the short River Graney, which flows through Lough O'Grady and past the town of Scarriff into the west side of Lough Derg.

Recreation
Lough Graney is a site for fishing perch, ferox trout, roach and bream.

In popular culture
 The Lough has a place in the history of Irish literature. This is because, in 1780, local poet and hedge school master Brian Merriman set the beginning of his mock-Aisling poem Cúirt An Mheán Oíche ("The Midnight Court") along the shores of Lough Graney. A stone which has been carved with the opening lines of the poem in Munster Irish now stands overlooking the site.

See also
 List of loughs in Ireland

References

Lakes of County Clare